Ma Junqing (born October 1956) is a Chinese politician from Jilin province, currently Vice-Chairman of the Jilin Provincial People's Congress. He was the vice governor, then Deputy Communist Party Secretary of Jilin province.

Ma was born in Gongzhuling, Jilin. He joined the Communist Party in March 1976, shortly before the death of Mao. He graduated from the department of economics at Jilin University, and later obtained a doctorate in economics.

Ma's political career originated in the Jilin provincial organization of the Communist Youth League, in which he served as deputy secretary, and secretary, before being transferred to serve as mayor of Songyuan.  He later served as party chief of Siping, and the secretary-general of the Jilin government. He joined the Jilin provincial Party Standing Committee as head of the propaganda department in 2004; later he took on the office of the secretary-general of the Jilin provincial party committee, and in August 2008, was re-shuffled to Vice-Governor.  In May 2012 he was named executive vice-governor of Jilin.

In November 2015, he was named deputy party chief of Jilin province. He left the post in 2017 upon reaching retirement age. He retired in January, 2018.

References

Jilin University alumni
1956 births
People from Siping
Chinese Communist Party politicians from Jilin
People's Republic of China politicians from Jilin
Political office-holders in Jilin
Living people